Na Wewe (You Too) is a 2010 Belgian live action short film. The film's runtime is approximately 19 minutes, starring Renaud Rutten and Fabrice Kwizera. It was directed by Ivan Goldschmidt, written by first-timer Jean-Luc Pening, and produced by Goldschmidt, Pening, Dries Phlypo and Jean-Claude van Rijckeghem. The film was shot in the summer of 2009. It is set in Burundi in 1994, during the civil war between Hutus and Tutsis and exposes the absurdity of ethnic conflicts.  It's a "compact story about identity that's both tense and darkly funny".

Plot
A minivan transporting ordinary citizens is stopped on a Burundian dirt road. With force a band of Hutu rebels armed with Kalashnikovs get the passengers off.  The rebel leader barks:"Hutus to the left, Tutsis to the right!".  The sorting fails as all hurry to the left and neither passengers nor rebels can distinguish Hutus from Tutsis.

Accolades
The film received the Special Jury Award  Honourable Mention at the 20th Flickerfest.
On 25 January 2011 it was nominated for the Academy Award for Best Live Action Short Film at the 83rd Academy Awards.

References

External links
 
 

2010 films
2010 action films
Belgian short films
Films shot in Burundi

2010 short films